Headline Country is an American country music news and entertainment show airing on GAC. The show is produced by Surfing Moose Productions.

The show premiered in January 2009 and runs biweekly in 30 minute episodes.

Based in Nashville, TN, "Headline Country" is the only nationally airing television program to cover the world of country music. The show features news, interviews, performances, and various forms of "behind-the-scenes" content.

References

External links
 Headline Country's Official Website

2009 American television series debuts
2000s American music television series